North Dakota State University District is a  historic district on the campus of North Dakota State University, in Fargo, North Dakota, that was listed on the National Register of Historic Places in 1986.

Also known as North Dakota Agricultural College, it was built in Late 19th and 20th Century Revivals, Moderne, and Late Victorian architectural styles.

The listing included 12 contributing buildings, one contributing structure, and one contributing object.

Important contributing buildings include:
College Hall-Old Main, a Richardsonian Romanesque building built in 1891
Mechanical Building, or Mechanical Arts building, built in 1893
South Engineering, built 1907
Science Hall-Minard, built 1901
Carnegie Library-Putnam Hall, built 1904, and
Ceres Hall, built 1910.

See also 
 University of North Dakota Historic District, in Grand Forks, also NRHP-listed
 Valley City State University Historic District, in Valley City, also NRHP-listed

References

University and college buildings on the National Register of Historic Places in North Dakota
Geography of Cass County, North Dakota
Moderne architecture in North Dakota
Victorian architecture in North Dakota
Historic districts on the National Register of Historic Places in North Dakota
National Register of Historic Places in Cass County, North Dakota
North Dakota State University
University and college campuses in North Dakota